Kharbyaty (Kharbiaanguud) is a rural locality (a selo) in Tunkinsky District, Republic of Buryatia, Russia. The population was 551 as of 2010. There are 17 streets.

Geography 
Kharbyaty is located 11 km east of Kyren (the district's administrative centre) by road. Maly Zhemchug is the nearest rural locality.

References 

Rural localities in Tunkinsky District